is a former Japanese football player.

Club statistics

References

External links

jsgoal.jp

1982 births
Living people
Ryutsu Keizai University alumni
Association football people from Gunma Prefecture
Japanese footballers
J1 League players
J2 League players
Japan Football League players
Nagoya Grampus players
FC Ryukyu players
Mito HollyHock players
Association football midfielders